The Michelle and Barack Obama Sports Complex, previously known as the Rancho Cienega Recreation Center, is a multibuilding sports complex in Baldwin Hills, Los Angeles. The complex is named after Michelle and Barack Obama, where Barack Obama held a rally at the center in 2007. The complex neighbors Susan Miller Dorsey High School, who is partnered with them for its use in school events.

History 

In 1936, plans for what would become the Rancho Cienega Playground was laid out, with construction beginning that same year. In 1937, the newly opened Susan Miller Dorsey High School partnered with the center to host its sporting events. Sports coach Benny Lefebvre served as a playground supervisor for the park in the 1930s. In 1998, the pool at the Center was renamed to the Celes King III Swimming Pool, honoring the businessman.

In 2007, presidential candidate Barack Obama held a rally at the Rancho Cienega Recreation Center in the beginning of his campaign. In 2013, the Los Angeles Dodgers alongside the LA84 Foundation dedicated a Dodgers Dreamfield in the Center, with the field being the 30th Dreamfield they had unveiled.

Renovation and renaming 
In 2015, Studio Pali Fekete Architects were selected by the City of Los Angeles to expand and redevelop the Rancho Cienega Sports Complex, which would be renamed the Michelle and Barack Obama Sports Complex in honor of Michelle and Barack Obama. The project would be designed to meet LEED silver certification and have a net zero energy use. In April 2021, it was reported that the project was 95% complete and would be finished during the summer.

On June 29, 2022, the new Michelle and Barack Obama Sports Complex was inaugurated. It now includes over 24 acres with an indoor gym and two high school basketball courts as well as a mezzanine walking track and a new Olympic-size pool. The court was renovated as a part of the city and the Los Angeles Clippers's efforts to renovate all 350 courts in Los Angeles. In July 7, 2022, the complex opened to the public.

Facilities 
The facilities include a 23,000-square-foot pool facility, a 16,000-square-foot basketball gymnasium, a raised walking track, a tennis center and stadium, and an enclosed garden. The facilities are pre-engineered manufactured buildings so it would be cost-effective.

References 

Buildings and structures in Los Angeles
Barack Obama
Michelle Obama